William Arthur Bonds  (born 17 September 1946) is a former professional footballer and manager, who is most often associated with West Ham United with whom he spent 27 years as player and manager. He played 799 first-team games for West Ham in a career spanning 21 seasons.

Background
Born in Woolwich, south-east London, Bonds grew up in nearby Eltham, where he played for a Sunday boys' team, Moatbridge, and Kent Schoolboys and joined the groundstaff at Charlton Athletic after leaving school at 15. He played in the youth and A team and occasionally in the reserves before joining the playing staff shortly before his 18th birthday in September 1964.

Club career
Bonds made his League debut for Charlton against Northampton Town in February 1965 and became a regular in the first team, going on to make 95 League appearances, scoring one goal, before being signed by Ron Greenwood for West Ham United for a fee of £50,000 in May 1967. He made his first appearance for West Ham in a testimonial match for Ken Brown in the same month and made his League debut against Sheffield Wednesday in the opening game of the 1967–68 season. He was ever-present in the 1968–69 and 1969–70 seasons and played 124 consecutive league games until injury ended his run of appearances in October 1970.
Bonds played his first three seasons as a right-back before Greenwood switched him to midfield in the 1970–71 season where he counterbalanced the skills of Trevor Brooking. Bonds was at his peak in the early 1970s, helping West Ham to the semi-final of the Football League Cup in the 1971–72 season, where they lost to Stoke City after a second replay, and topping the scorers list at West Ham in the 1973–74 season with 13 goals, including a hat-trick against Chelsea. After the departure of Bobby Moore in March 1974, Bonds was appointed to the captaincy and led the club to an FA Cup final victory over Fulham in 1975 and to the final of the 1976 European Cup Winners' Cup despite a groin injury that interrupted the latter half of the 1974–75 season and part of the 1975–76 season. Greenwood moved Bonds from midfield to the back four as centre-half alongside Tommy Taylor shortly before the end of the 1976–77 season, where he was able to come out from defence with the ball.

He experienced relegation with West Ham at the end of the 1977–78 season but led West Ham to a second FA Cup victory over First Division club Arsenal in 1980, becoming the only West Ham captain to lift the FA Cup on two occasions. In 1980–81, he led West Ham to the final of the League Cup, which was lost to Liverpool after a replay, and to promotion back to the First Division.

Bonds passed Bobby Moore's club record of appearances in 1982–83 and 'officially' retired in May 1984, relinquishing the captaincy to Alvin Martin. A spate of injuries to first-team players saw him return to the squad and make 26 league and cup appearances in 1984–85. He missed the entire 1985–86 season due to a toe injury but, having passed his 40th birthday, he was able to re-establish himself in the first-team during the 1986–87 season. A knee injury that forced him out of the last two games of the 1987–88 season led to a decision to finally retire in the summer of 1988, having played his last game at Southampton in April 1988 at the age of 41 years and 226 days.

Bonds had remained at the club as a player for over 20 years, scoring 48 goals in a club record 663 League appearances. He established himself as a local hero and was the supporters' choice for 'Hammer of the Year' in 1971, 1974, 1975 and 1987. He was appointed Member of the Order of the British Empire (MBE) in January 1988 and was presented with the PFA Merit Award in April 1988 by his fellow professional players. In May 2013 Bonds was awarded West Ham United's first ever lifetime achievement award.

On 6 February 2019, it was announced that the East Stand at London Stadium would be renamed the Billy Bonds Stand. The unveiling took place ahead of West Ham's home fixture against Newcastle United on 2 March.

International career
Bonds was capped twice at England Under-23 international level and was on the bench as a non-playing substitute for the senior international team for a World Cup qualifying match against Italy in November 1977. A collision with goalkeeper Phil Parkes in the last game of the 1980-1981 season broke two of Bonds' ribs, and ruled him out of selection for England against Brazil in May 1981. Bonds and Alvin Martin were in line to make their England debuts in that game.

Managerial career
After Bonds retired as a player in 1988, West Ham manager John Lyall appointed him as youth coach. He unsuccessfully applied for the manager's post when Lyall left the club in July 1989 after West Ham had been relegated. However, when new manager Lou Macari resigned seven months later, Bonds was appointed manager in February 1990. In his first full season in charge, he took the club to promotion, when they finished as runner-up to Oldham Athletic in 1990-91 season, also reaching the semi-finals of the FA Cup where they lost to Nottingham Forest. He was awarded a second testimonial in the same season.

West Ham were relegated in the 1991–92 season in bottom place, but the board kept faith in Bonds and he led them to promotion the following season, when they finished as runner-up to Newcastle United. Bonds guided West Ham to a 13th-place finish in the 1993–94 Premier League. He resigned in August 1994, just before the new season began, when he was replaced by Harry Redknapp. He had spells in coaching at Queens Park Rangers and Reading before making a return to management with Millwall in May 1997. He managed 53 games before being sacked by the club the following year as they finished in the bottom half of Division Two.

Career statistics

Honours
FA Cup: 1974–75, 1979–80
Football League Second Division: 1980–81
League Cup runner-up: 1980–81
FA Charity Shield runner-up: 1975, 1980
European Cup Winners' Cup runner-up: 1975–76

References

External links
 

1946 births
Living people
English footballers
England under-23 international footballers
Charlton Athletic F.C. players
West Ham United F.C. players
English football managers
Premier League managers
English Football League managers
West Ham United F.C. managers
Queens Park Rangers F.C. non-playing staff
Millwall F.C. managers
Members of the Order of the British Empire
Footballers from Woolwich
English Football League players
English Football Hall of Fame inductees
Association football defenders
Association football coaches
FA Cup Final players
Reading F.C. non-playing staff
West Ham United F.C. non-playing staff